Ekonomist is a Turkish-language weekly news and international affairs publication. The magazine was started in 1960. It was formerly owned by Doğan Media Group which is renamed as Doğan Burda Media Group. It is headquartered in Istanbul.

Ekonomist has awarded "Business People of the Year" awards since the early 1990s.

Together with the monthly Capital it runs a "CEO Club" with around 500 members.

References

External links
 Official website

1960 establishments in Turkey
Business magazines published in Turkey
Magazines established in 1960
Magazines published in Istanbul
Turkish-language magazines
Weekly news magazines published in Turkey